Obninsk Meteorological Tower is a 310 meter tall silver-grey guyed steel tube mast at Obninsk, Russia. Obninsk Meteorological Tower was built in 1958 and is equipped with multiple platforms on different heights, on which devices for measuring radioactivity and for meteorological science are installed.

Obninsk Meteorological Tower is the official landmark of the Russian science town Obninsk.

See also
 List of masts

References

External links
 http://vmm310.ru/en
 http://skyscraperpage.com/diagrams/?b59592
 

Guyed masts
Towers in Russia
Towers completed in 1958
1958 establishments in Russia
Meteorology in the Soviet Union
Towers built in the Soviet Union
Buildings and structures in Kaluga Oblast
Obninsk
Cultural heritage monuments of regional significance in Kaluga Oblast